Per Billeskov Krøldrup (born 31 July 1979) is a Danish former professional footballer who played as a defender.

He has played 33 games for the Denmark national football team, and was part of their squad for the 2004 European Championship.

Club career

Early career
Born in Farsø, Krøldrup started his footballing career at Danish lower league clubs Farsø/Ullits IK and Aalborg Chang. He then went on to play for Copenhagen-based B.93 in the second-tier Danish 1st Division before transferring to Udinese in the Italian top-flight Serie A championship in 2001. In his final season at the club, they finished fourth and qualified for the UEFA Champions League.

Everton
In June 2005, Krøldrup moved from Udinese to English club Everton on a four-year deal for a transfer fee of £5million. Before having played a single game for the club, he suffered a groin injury and had to undergo surgery. He made his debut for Everton on 26 December 2005 in a 4-0 defeat to Aston Villa, which was to be his only league game for the club.

His Everton career was later described as one of the worst transfers in the history of the club and English football, and Krøldrup has stated his difficulties of adapting to the physical aspects of the English game.

Fiorentina
Krøldrup transferred back to Italy on 19 January 2006, when he joined ACF Fiorentina, 31 days after his Everton debut.

Following the 2006 Serie A scandal, where several clubs were on trial for match fixing, Fiorentina were initially relegated to Serie B in July 2006. Krøldrup was amongst the players wanting to leave. However, as Fiorentina made an appeal to the Italian Football Federation, the club remained in Serie A and most of their players, including Krøldrup, remained with the Florence club. He made his Champions League debut on 12 August 2008 against Slavia Prague, a 2–0 win for La Viola.

Krøldrup's contract with Fiorentina was set to expire in June 2010, but on 17 May 2010 he signed a new deal that expired in 2012.

Pescara and Olhanense
On 8 March 2013, Krøldrup signed a short-term contract with Serie A club Delfino Pescara 1936 for the rest of the 2012–13 season.

After a Summer as a free agent, he signed for Olhanense of the Portuguese Primeira Liga on 1 October 2013.

International career
At Udinese, Krøldrup played alongside Danish national team player Martin Jørgensen, who claimed that Krøldrup was ready for the Danish national team in March 2002. Krøldrup was not called up for the national team until February 2004, making his debut against Turkey. He was a part of the Danish squad for the 2004 European Championship, though he did not play any games at the tournament.

References

External links
Per Billeskov Kroldrup – Profile ACF Fiorentina official site
English Viola

1979 births
Living people
People from Vesthimmerland Municipality
Danish men's footballers
Denmark international footballers
Boldklubben af 1893 players
Udinese Calcio players
Everton F.C. players
ACF Fiorentina players
Delfino Pescara 1936 players
S.C. Olhanense players
Aalborg Chang players
UEFA Euro 2004 players
Serie A players
Premier League players
Primeira Liga players
Danish expatriate men's footballers
Expatriate footballers in Italy
Expatriate footballers in England
Expatriate footballers in Portugal
Danish expatriate sportspeople in Portugal
2010 FIFA World Cup players
Association football defenders
Sportspeople from the North Jutland Region